The Post-Vulgate Cycle, also known as the Post-Vulgate Arthuriad, the Post-Vulgate Roman du Graal (Romance of the Grail) or the Pseudo-Robert de Boron Cycle, is one of the major Old French prose cycles of Arthurian literature from the early 13th century. It is considered essentially a rewriting of the earlier Vulgate Cycle (also known as the Lancelot-Grail cycle), with much left out but also much added, including characters and scenes from the Prose Tristan.

History 
The Post-Vulgate Cycle, written anonymously probably between 1230 and 1235 (different estimates of the beginning date) to 1240, is an attempt to create greater unity in the material, and to de-emphasise the secular love affair between Lancelot and Guinevere in favor of the Quest for the Holy Grail. It omits almost all of the Vulgate Cycle's Lancelot Proper section, making it much shorter than its source, and directly condemns everything but the spiritual life. It did not survive complete, but has been reconstructed from Old French, Castilian, Old Spanish, and Galician-Portuguese fragments. Earlier theories postulated the so-called "pseudo-Boron" cycle, named so due to one manuscript's attribution of its original authorship to Robert de Boron, was either older than the Vulgate or derived from the same common and now lost source. The Post-Vulgate (or at least its Suite du Merlin section) was also one of the most important sources of Thomas Malory's Le Morte d'Arthur.

Branches 
The work is divided into four parts, named similar to their corresponding Vulgate versions.

 The Post-Vulgate Estoire del Saint Grail, which did not differ significantly from the Vulgate version. It tells the story of Joseph of Arimathea and his son Josephus, who brings the Holy Grail to Britain.

The Post-Vulgate Estoire de Merlin, which also bears but few changes from the Vulgate. It concerns Merlin and the early history of Arthur.
To this section is added the Post-Vulgate Suite du Merlin, also known as the Suite Post-Vulgate and the Huth-Merlin, the first major departure from the source material. It adds many adventures of Arthur and the early Knights of the Round Table, and includes details about Arthur's incestuous begetting of Mordred and receiving Excalibur from the Lady of the Lake that are not found in the Vulgate. The author added some relevant material from the Vulgate Lancelot Proper (otherwise missing from the Post-Vulgate Cycle) and the first version of the Prose Tristan to connect the events to the Queste section.

The Post-Vulgate Queste del Saint Graal. The Post-Vulgate Queste is very different in tone and content from the Vulgate version, but still describes the knights' search for the Holy Grail, which can only be achieved by the worthy knights Galahad, Percival, and Bors. Elements from the Prose Tristan are present, including the character Palamedes and King Mark's invasions of Arthur's realm.

The Post-Vulgate Mort Artu, concerning Arthur's death at the hands of his son Mordred and the collapse of his kingdom. It is based more closely on the Vulgate Mort but was abridged and rewritten with greater connectivity to the previous sections.

Modern editions
The first full English translation of the Vulgate and Post-Vulgate Cycles were overseen by Norris J. Lacy.
Lacy, Norris J. (ed.) (April 1, 1995). Lancelot-Grail: The Old French Arthurian Vulgate and Post-Vulgate in Translation. New York: Garland.
Volume 4 of 5  (1 April 1995). : The Quest for the Holy Grail, The Death of Arthur, and The Post-Vulgate, Part I: The Merlin Continuation.
Volume 5 of 5 (1 May 1996). : The Post-Vulgate, Parts I-III: The Merlin Continuation (end), The Quest for the Holy Grail, The Death of Arthur, and Chapter Summaries and Index of Proper Names.
Lacy, Norris J. (ed.). The Lancelot-Grail Reader: Selections from the Medieval French Arthurian Cycle (2000). New York: Garland. 
Lacy, Norris J. (ed.). Lancelot–Grail: The Old French Arthurian Vulgate and Post-Vulgate in Translation. Cambridge: D.S. Brewer.
Volume 8 of 10 (March 2010). : The Post-Vulgate Cycle: The Merlin Continuation.
Volume 9 of 10 (October 2010). : The Post-Vulgate Cycle: The Quest for the Holy Grail and The Death of Arthur.
Volume 10 of 10 (March 2010). : Chapter Summaries for the Vulgate and Post-Vulgate Cycles and Index of Proper Names.

References

Sources
Bogdanow, Fanni. (1966). The Romance of the Grail: A Study of the Structure and Genesis of a Thirteenth-Century Arthurian Prose Romance. Manchester: Manchester University Press.
Bogdanow, Fanni. (1986). "La Chute du royaume d'Arthur.  Evolution d'un thème."  Romania 107, pp. 504–19.
Lacy, Norris J. (Ed.) (2000). The Lancelot-Grail Reader. New York: Garland. .

1240s books
Arthurian literature in French
Holy Grail
Medieval French romances
Works based on Merlin